Álvaro Jara (16 June 1923 – 20 April 1998) was a Chilean historian who won the National History Award in 1990.

His major work is War and Society in Chile, which was not originally published in Chile but in France with the title of Guerre et société au Chili in 1961. This work included a new view on the themes of the conquest of Chile.

Works
Pineda and Bascuñan man of his time (1954)
Chilean Indian Law (1956)
The salary of the Indians and the gold sesmos Rate Santillan (1961)
Guerre et société au Chili (1961) (Spanish version War and Society in Chile in 1971)
Sources for the history of labor in the Kingdom of Chile (1965)
Three essays on Latin American mining economy (1966)
Captivity and happy individual reason dilated wars of the Kingdom of Chile (1973)
Indigenous Employment and wage sixteenth century (1987)

20th-century Chilean historians
20th-century Chilean male writers
1923 births
1998 deaths
University of Chile alumni
University of Paris alumni
Academic staff of the University of Chile
Academic staff of the University of Concepción
People from Talca
Chilean people of German descent
Chilean people of Danish descent
Chilean people of French descent
Chilean expatriates in France